Sloboda National Nature Park (Also: Slobozhanskyi NNP) is a national park of Ukraine that covers a forest-steppe region at the confluence of the Merla and Merchik Rivers in the East Poltava Highlands of eastern Ukraine.  The park features an extensive complex of marshes, swamps, and other wetlands, forming rich habitat for diverse plants and animals.  The park is administratively in Bohodukhiv Raion of Kharkiv Oblast.

Topography
The valley of the Merla and Merchik Rivers has a low terrace of floodplains, meadows, and marshes.  The second terrace has hills and forest-steppe, with meadow-bog vegetation in the depressions.

Climate and ecoregion
The climate of Sloboda is Humid continental climate, warm summer (Köppen climate classification (Dfb)).

Flora and fauna
More than 90% of the park's territory is forest.  The right bank of the Merla River is a natural maple-lime forest; the left bank has natural and artificial pine plantations.  The bog-forests are primarily alder and birch.

Public use

To protect the natural environment within the park, recreational activities are organized and controlled.  The public is welcome on ecological-educational routes, and scientific-cognitive routes.  Lodging is available in designated centers in the park, as are campsites, picnic areas, and pavilions for group activities.  Excursions and self-directed hiking require a small fee.

See also
 National Parks of Ukraine

References

External links

National parks of Ukraine